Kozłowiec Transmitter (RTCN Kozłowiec) is a 213 metre tall guyed mast for FM and TV situated at Kozłowiec, Masovian Voivodeship in Poland.
This transmitter mast, which was built in 1998

Transmitted Programmes

Digital television MPEG-4

FM Radio

See also

 List of masts

References

External links
 http://emi.emitel.pl/EMITEL/obiekty.aspx?obiekt=DODR_E1F
 http://radiopolska.pl/wykaz/pokaz_lokalizacja.php?pid=108
 http://www.przelaczenie.eu/mapy/swietokrzyskie
 http://www.dvbtmap.eu/mapcoverage.html?chid=7412

Radio masts and towers in Poland
Przysucha County
1998 establishments in Poland
Towers completed in 1998